Novator Partners - London-based private equity firm with links to Iceland
 NPO Novator - Russian missile design company formerly known as OKB Novator or OKB Lyulev
 Project Novator - a project of BT Group
 APC Novator - armored car by Ukrainska bronetekhnika (Ukraine).